Milena may refer to:

 Milena (skipper), a genus of skippers in the family Hesperiidae
 Milena, Sicily, a comune in the Province of Caltanissetta, Italy
 Milena (given name), a popular female Slavic name 
 Milena (film), a 1991 French biographical film about Czech writer Milena Jesenská

See also
Malena (disambiguation)
Molina (disambiguation)
Malina (disambiguation)
Melena
Melina (disambiguation)
Milina
Molena